Abrawan was a kind of muslin cloth produced in Indian subcontinent. The Abrawan was characterized by the nature of the fabric that was like flowing water.

Name 
Abrawan means ''running water'' that symbolizes its fineness.

''Running water'' and ''Woven air'' were poetic names of contemporaneous muslins.

Weave 
Abrawan was a plain weave fabric made primarily of cotton, with silk variations available. It was a transparent, lightweight structure, one of Dacca's finest muslins. Weavers used to weave qualities similar to Abrawan during the monsoon season to protect the yarn from breaking due to dry weather.

Quotes 
Abrawan was recorded for its fine texture. There are two stories related to Abrawan that demonstrate the grandeur of the fabric. The first one is related to an argument between the sixth Mughal emperor Aurangzeb and his daughter where the king is arguing modesty. Another tale is about the Nawab of Bengal Alivardi Khan expelling of a weaver who, ignored, let a cow swallow the Abrawan cloth overlaid on a lawn.

Present day uses 
With time, the real artwork has inevitably lost all of its authentic characteristics. The imitation can be seen as

Tarbana 
A form of Abrawan is Tarbana Sari. Tarbana is a silk and gold threaded tissue Sari. The fabric used in the production of Tarbanas contains a warp of silk and a weft of zari.

See also 

 Mughal Karkhanas
 Mulboos khas

References 

Textile arts of Bangladesh
Woven fabrics